Philippe Clay (7 March 1927 – 13 December 2007), born Philippe Mathevet, was a French mime artist, singer and actor.

He was known for his tall and slim silhouette (he was 1.90 m tall) and for his interpretations of songs by Charles Aznavour, Claude Nougaro, Jean-Roger Caussimon, Boris Vian, Serge Gainsbourg, Jean Yanne, Léo Ferré, Jacques Datin, Jean-Claude Massoulier or Bernard Dimey. He interpreted “La Complainte des Apaches” for the TV series Les Brigades du Tigre, written by Henri Djian and composed by Claude Bolling.

As an actor, he appeared in many movies (Bell, Book and Candle) and television films. One of his famous roles is in the Jean Renoir film, French Cancan, where he played Casimir le Serpentin (a character inspired by Valentin le désossé).

Death
Philippe Clay died of a heart attack on December 13, 2007. He was survived by his wife, actress Maria Riquelme, and their son.

Filmography

References

External links
 
 Le coin du cinéphage

1927 births
2007 deaths
French male film actors
French male television actors
French Resistance members
French National Academy of Dramatic Arts alumni
20th-century French male actors
20th-century French male singers